First observed between August 4 and August 6, 1181, Chinese and Japanese astronomers recorded the supernova now known as SN 1181 in eight separate texts.
One of only nine supernovae in the Milky Way observable with the naked eye in recorded history, it appeared in the constellation Cassiopeia and was visible in the night sky for about 185 days.

Pulsar 3C-58
The radio and X-ray pulsar J0205+6449 (also known as 3C 58), which rotates about 15 times per second, has been identified as the possible remnant from this event.  If the supernova and pulsar are associated, the star is still rotating about as quickly as it did when it first formed. This is in contrast to the Crab pulsar, known to be the remnant of the SN 1054 supernova in the year 1054, which has lost two-thirds of its rotational energy in essentially the same time span.

A paper of radio surveys of 3C 58 published in 2006 indicated that this supernova remnant may be much older and thus not associated with SN 1181.
However, in 2013 it was shown that the latter result originated from an erroneous estimation of the distance to this supernova remnant (~3.2 kpc), and that a more realistic distance estimate (2.0±0.3 kpc) brings the age of 3C 58 back into agreement with the hypothesis that 3C 58 is the remnant of SN 1181.

Wolf-Rayet candidate remnant
In 2021, a team of astronomers led by Andreas Ritter and Quentin Parker from the University of Hong Kong announced the discovery of an alternative (claimed to be more likely) SN 1181 candidate: an extremely hot Wolf Rayet star dubbed Parker's Star (J005311 / IRAS 00500+6713) which is surrounded by a gaseous nebula named Pa 30 (Patchick 30) approximately 0.9 parsecs wide and expanding at 1100 kilometers per second. The measurements are based on an estimated distance of 3,000 parsecs based on GAIA data for the star. The observed properties of Pa 30 suggests it is the remnant of SN 1181 which apparently was a rare Type Iax supernova not resulting in the complete destruction of the merged progenitor stars. Hence J005311/Parker's Star is likely a so-called "zombie star".
The nebula was first detected on August 25, 2013 by American amateur astronomer Dana Patchick in WISE mid-infrared imagery as a Planetary Nebula candidate.

In addition to the WISE detection of Pa 30, the bright central star (Mg. 15.4) was discovered moments later through the use of the Galexview application that supported searching of GALEX image tiles. The nuv source (near ultra violet) spotted there matched with cataloged star UCAC4 788-002438. The Galex detection and UCAC4 788-002438 are alternative designations for IRAS 00500+6713, itself known since 1986.
Images secured in early September 2013 with the Kitt Peak 2.1m reflectorunder the direction of Dr. George Jacoby revealed an unusually faint shell in narrow-band [OIII] imagery surrounding the Mg. 15.4 central star. Taken together, Pa 30 was recorded in the HASH database as a 'likely PN', until September 30, 2021 when the status was upgraded to 'Supernova Remnant'.
In 2018, preliminary spectra of the hot central star by French amateur astronomer Pascal Le Dû  revealed unique spectral lines that were brought to the attention of professional collaborator Prof. Quentin Parker and colleagues who had independently observed the nebula and star with the 10m Grantecan Telescope on La Palma in 2017. It was this data which revealed the faint [SII] nebula lines from Pa30 and allowed the extreme expansion velocity to be measured.  This helped speed up the discovery process.

In October 2022, Professor Rob Fesen obtained deep narrowband imagery in the light of [SII] that revealed fine filaments not revealed until now.

See also
 Guest star (astronomy)
 List of supernovae
 List of supernova remnants
 SN 1054

References

Supernova remnants
Cassiopeia (constellation)
12th century in science
1181
810804
Historical supernovae